Robert Biddulph may refer to:

Rob Biddulph, British children's author and illustrator
Robert Biddulph (MP) (1801–1864), British MP
Robert Biddulph (British Army officer) (1835–1918), British general and Governor of Gibraltar, son of the above
Robert Myddelton Biddulph (1761–1814), MP for Herefordshire and Denbigh Boroughs
Robert Myddelton Biddulph (1805–1872), MP for Denbighshire and Lord Lieutenant of Denbighshire; son of the above